Tennessee's 3rd Senate district is one of 33 districts in the Tennessee Senate. It has been represented by Republican Rusty Crowe since 1990.

Geography
District 3 is based in Johnson City, the southernmost of the Tri-Cities, covering all of Unicoi and Washington Counties and most of Carter County. Other communities in the district include Elizabethton, Jonesborough, Erwin, Oak Grove, and Unicoi.

The district is located entirely within Tennessee's 1st congressional district, and overlaps with the 3rd, 4th, 6th, and 7th districts of the Tennessee House of Representatives. It borders the state of North Carolina.

Recent election results
Tennessee Senators are elected to staggered four-year terms, with odd-numbered districts holding elections in midterm years and even-numbered districts holding elections in presidential years.

2018

2014

Federal and statewide results in District 3

References 

3
Carter County, Tennessee
Unicoi County, Tennessee
Washington County, Tennessee